Kaeti & Company is a collection by Keith Roberts published in 1986.

Plot summary
Kaeti & Company is a collection of 10 stories.

Reception
Dave Langford reviewed Kaeti & Company for White Dwarf #79, and stated that "As a whole one might call it self-indulgent .... but in a 1000-copy limited edition, why not? Self-indulgence from such as Aldiss or Roberts towers above the best efforts of many others."

Reviews
Review by David V. Barrett (1986) in Vector 132
Review by Helen McNabb (1986) in Vector 132
Review by Dan Chow (1986) in Locus, #306 July 1986
Review by Charles de Lint (1987) in Fantasy Review, March 1987

References

1986 novels